Möge Khatun was a princess of the Bakrin tribe and a concubine of Genghis Khan and, after his death, a wife of Genghis' son Ögedei Khan. 

According to the historian Juvayni, "she was given to Genghis Khan by a chief of the Bakrin tribe, and he loved her very much." Ögedei also favored her, and she accompanied him on hunting expeditions. In 1241, after the death of Ögedei Khan, power briefly passed into her hands. By the spring of 1242, however, Töregene Khatun had assumed complete power as regent with the support of Chagatai and her sons with the title Great Khatun and replaced the ministers of Ögödei with her own.  Historian Timothy May has argued that Töregene Khatun waited until the death of Möge Khatun and Ögedei's first wife Boraqchin in order to reveal her true intentions with the regency. 

Möge Khatun did not have children.

See also
 History of Mongolia
 Genghis Khan
 Ogedei Khan

References

Genghis Khan
Wives of Genghis Khan
Slave concubines
Mongol concubines
13th-century Mongolian women